The Big Ten men's soccer tournament is the conference championship tournament in soccer for the Big Ten Conference.  The tournament has been held every year since 1991. It is a single-elimination tournament and seeding is based on regular season records. The winner, declared conference champion, receives the conference's automatic bid to the NCAA Division I men's soccer championship.

Champions

Key

Finals

Performance by school

Most championships

Records all-time by team
through 2022 Tournament

Notes

References

External links